The 1998 NCAA Division I Women's Golf Championships were contested at the 17th annual NCAA-sanctioned golf tournament to determine the individual and team national champions of women's Division I collegiate golf in the United States.

The tournament was held at the University Ridge Golf Course, near Madison, Wisconsin.

Defending champions Arizona State won the team championship, the Sun Devils' sixth title and fifth in six years.

Jennifer Rosales, from USC, won the individual title.

Individual results

Individual champion
 Jennifer Rosales, USC (279, −9)

Team leaderboard

 † = Won tie-breaker
 DC = Defending champion
 Debut appearance

References

NCAA Women's Golf Championship
Golf in Wisconsin
NCAA Women's Golf Championship
NCAA Women's Golf Championship
NCAA Women's Golf Championship